Ignacio Calles (born 24 October 1995) is an Argentinian rugby union player, currently playing for Top 14 side Pau. His preferred position is prop.

Amateur career
Calles started playing rugby at Los Cardos in Tandil, Argentina. After a few years he move to Buenos Aires and played in Liceo Naval (rugby) until 2016 where he signed a contract Section Paloise, the representative team of the city of Pau.

Professional career
Calles signed a new deal with Pau in October 2020, having originally joined the side in 2018. He was named in the Argentinian squad for the 2020 Tri Nations Series in October 2020.

References

External links
itsrugby.co.uk Profile

1995 births
Living people
Argentine rugby union players
Section Paloise players
Rugby union props